Beyond River Cottage is the fourth series of the Channel 4 programme that follows Hugh Fearnley-Whittingstall as he pursues the ideal of rural self-sufficiency as a farm-owner in Dorset.

Show summary
This series begins five years after Fearnley-Whittingstall first left the city and moved to River Cottage. With a growing family, Fearnley-Whittingstall, his wife, and their two young sons, move to a  farm, which is ten times larger than the original River Cottage property. Fearnley-Whittingstall also buys an old dairy farm and—over the course of the series—renovates its buildings into "River Cottage H.Q.", a small of kitchen, café restaurant and centre teaching people how to cook.

List of episodes

References

External links
 

Channel 4 original programming
2004 British television series debuts
2004 British television series endings